is a 2013 Japanese drama film directed by Yōji Yamada. It is a remake of the Japanese film Tokyo Story.

Plot
The film is set in Tokyo and Ōsakikamijima, Hiroshima.

Cast
Isao Hashizume as Shukichi Hirayama  
Kazuko Yoshiyuki as Tomiko Hirayama
Masahiko Nishimura as Koichi 
Tomoko Nakajima as Shigeko 
Satoshi Tsumabuki as Shoji 
Yui Natsukawa as Fumiko
Yū Aoi as Noriko Mamiya
Ryuichiro Shibata as Minoru
Ayumu Maruyama as Isamu
Narumi Kayashima as Kyoko Hattori 
Nenji Kobayashi as Sanpei Numata 
Jun Fubuki as Kayo

Reception
The film grossed ¥1.56 billion (US$15.2 million) at the Japanese box office. Film Business Asia's Derek Elley gave the film a rating of 4 out of 10.

References

External links
 

2013 drama films
2013 films
Films scored by Joe Hisaishi
Films directed by Yoji Yamada
Remakes of Japanese films
Films set in Tokyo
Japanese drama films
Shochiku films
Films with screenplays by Yôji Yamada
Yasujirō Ozu
2010s Japanese films